Smut Peddlers are an American punk band originally from Redondo Beach, California. The band has been performing live since 1993 and has toured in Europe and North America. The Smut Peddlers are notorious in Southern California for their spirited and rowdy live shows.

History 
The band was formed in Redondo Beach in April 1993.

In 1995, Smut Peddlers released their first album, Failure on the band's own label Ransom Records.  The follow-up Freedom was released in 1997. Their third full-length album Tarball 2000 was released on Ransom Records in 1999. ISM is their fourth full-length album, released in 2001. Their fifth album, Coming Out, was released in 2004 on the independent label, TKO Records. A live DVD/CD of the band titled That's Amore was released by TKO Records in 2005.

The band's music was featured in Big Brother magazine's 1996 skateboarding video. They were also been featured on the 2002 soundtrack to Jackass: The Movie and the 2006 soundtrack to Jackass Number Two. In addition, the band's music has been featured on several episodes of the television shows Jackass, Wildboyz, and Rob and Big. The band also contributed two songs to the Jackass video game.

The band toured Europe in August 2002, playing 16 cities throughout Germany, Switzerland, the Netherlands, and Belgium, headlining all shows except three. Smut Peddlers also toured the United States in May/June 2005.

The band has released a new album for the first time in ten years titled Going In on July 12, 2014, on their own label, Ransom Records. On June 30, Smut Peddlers released a video supporting their new album of the song "California Gold" on YouTube.

Band members

Current 
John Ransom – vocals
Gish Thornton – bass
Julia Smut – drums
Prospect – guitar
Chuk Davis – guitar

Past 
Mike Angulo (deceased) – guitar (1992–1996)
Doug Winbury – guitar  (1992–2001)
Kristian Dragge (deceased) – guitar (1996)
Kevin Sullivan – guitar (1996)
Bert Orlando – guitar (1998–1999)
Roger Ramjet – guitar (1999–2003)
Sean Mallard –  guitar (2002–2007)

Discography

Albums 
"The Demos" (1993–1994)
Failure (1995)
Freedom (1997)
Tarball 2000 (1999)
ISM (2001)
Coming Out (2004)
1993–1994: The Demos (2007)
Going In (2014)
High Anxiety Stress Fear (2018)

7-inches 
"Live at the Hermosa Saloon" (1998)
"Silicone & STP" (1999)
"Bipolar Girl" (2000)
"Exit Plan" (2004)

10-inches 
"Ten Inch" (2003)

External links 
Official website
Facebook page

Musical groups from Los Angeles
Punk rock groups from California
Musical groups established in 1993